Colonel Littleton (born December 15, 1943) is an American fashion designer and business proprietor, best known for his Col. Littleton brand of leather goods, apparel and specialty products − most handmade in his Lynnville, TN workshop by local craftsmen. His designs are sold through his Americana Collection catalog and in over 800 stores worldwide.  Col. Littleton, The Great American Leather Company, was established in 1987.

Early life and career

Colonel Littleton was born Garry Allen Littleton in Camden, Tennessee to Avery (née Allen) and Lester Coleman Littleton, a millwright and carpenter.

His mother died shortly after his birth and he was initially raised by his grandparents, in Holladay, TN, while his father sought work in east Tennessee.

He graduated from Bellevue High School in Nashville, TN, attended David Lipscomb University and later served in the US Coast Guard. He married Norma Ann (Susie) Hobbs in 1975. He worked at Tom James Co., where he sold custom men’s clothing and as National Sales Director at The Benson Company (later known as Benson Records), a music publishing company in Nashville, TN. Later, he worked for New York based companies like Ghurka and Trafalgar, selling clothing and accessories to men’s specialty stores.

Business

He launched his label in 1987 from the third floor attic of his home, selling antique cufflinks to specialty stores such as Paul Stuart in New York City, that appreciated his eye for the interesting. He designed the packaging, creating the cross swords logo and Col. Littleton motif that would become his brand mark.

From antique cufflinks he moved into pocket knives, which he designed using mother of pearl and bone. He offered customers the option to engrave the handle and/or bolsters.

Over the years, the business has expanded into leather goods, home accessories, apparel, belts and more.

References 

American fashion businesspeople
American fashion designers
1943 births
Living people
People from Giles County, Tennessee
People from Camden, Tennessee